Feoktistov is a small lunar impact crater on the far side of the Moon. It lies in the northern hemisphere, to the northwest of the Mare Moscoviense. This crater has a small outward extension along the northern side, giving it the appearance of two overlapping craters that have merged. There are slight indentations of the rim along the east and northwest sides. The rim is otherwise rounded and not significantly worn. Apart from an irregular strip in the northeast, the floor is relatively featureless.

The crater was named in honor of cosmonaut Konstantin Feoktistov who was the first non-military person in space, flying on Voskhod 1 in 1964.

Satellite craters
By convention these features are identified on lunar maps by placing the letter on the side of the crater midpoint that is closest to Feoktistov.

References

 
 
 
 
 
 
 
 
 
 
 
 

Impact craters on the Moon